Trey Anthony Lyles (born November 5, 1995) is a Canadian professional basketball player for the Sacramento Kings of the National Basketball Association (NBA). He was drafted by the Utah Jazz following his freshman season at the University of Kentucky.

High school career

Entering his senior year of high school in Indianapolis, Lyles was ranked as one of the best high school basketball players in the U.S. and was recruited heavily by Kentucky, Indiana, and Louisville. Lyles originally committed to Indiana in September 2010 during his freshman year of high school, but then later decommitted in August 2012. Lyles signed a letter of intent on November 5, 2013 to play and study at the University of Kentucky.

During his senior year of high school, Lyles averaged 23.7 points, 12.9 rebounds and 3.5 assists and led Arsenal Tech to the IHSAA Class 4A State Championship game with a 63-59 victory over Lake Central. Following the conclusion of his senior season, Lyles was voted Indiana Mr. Basketball over fellow high school seniors Trevon Bluiett, who signed to play at Xavier University and James Blackmon Jr. who signed with Indiana University.

College career
Lyles enrolled at Kentucky on June 12, 2014. Due to an unspecified leg injury, Lyles sat out Kentucky's six-game exhibition series in Nassau, Bahamas from August 10 through August 17. As a freshman, Lyles was named to the 2015 All-SEC Freshman Team and helped lead the Wildcats to a 2015 NCAA Final Four appearance.

On April 9, 2015, Lyles along with Kentucky teammates Andrew Harrison, Aaron Harrison, Dakari Johnson, Devin Booker, Karl-Anthony Towns and Willie Cauley-Stein declared to enter their names into the 2015 NBA draft.

Professional career

Utah Jazz (2015–2017)
On June 25, 2015, Lyles was selected with the 12th overall pick in the 2015 NBA draft by the Utah Jazz. He signed his rookie scale contract with the Jazz on July 7. Lyles averaged 3.0 points and 3.6 rebounds per game over the first two months of his rookie season. He began picking up his production with more steady minutes during the month of January, scoring in double figures for the first time on January 4 with 13 points against the Houston Rockets. On January 9, in a win over the Miami Heat, he recorded 10 rebounds for the first time, and on January 14, he scored a then season-high 19 points in a loss to the Sacramento Kings. On February 3, he was named a Rising Stars Challenge participant at the 2016 NBA All-Star Weekend, replacing the injured Nikola Mirotić on the World Team roster. On April 10, he scored a career-high 22 points in a 100–84 win over the Denver Nuggets.

Denver Nuggets (2017–2019)
On June 22, 2017, Lyles was traded, along with the draft rights to Tyler Lydon, to the Denver Nuggets in exchange for the draft rights to Donovan Mitchell. On December 2, 2017, he scored a season-high 18 points in a 115–100 win over the Los Angeles Lakers. On December 10, 2017, he scored a career-high 25 points in a 126–116 overtime loss to the Indiana Pacers. On January 5, 2018, he set a new career high with 26 points in a 99–91 win over the Utah Jazz.

San Antonio Spurs (2019–2021)
On July 12, 2019, Lyles signed with the San Antonio Spurs. On February 6, 2020, Lyles had a double-double, scoring a season-high 23 points while grabbing 10 rebounds and two steals in an 125-117 loss against the Portland Trail Blazers. On February 29, 2020, Lyles scored 20 points, nine rebounds, two assists, four steals, and one block in a 114–113 win over the Orlando Magic. On March 2, 2020, Lyles got himself 20 points again, along with three rebounds, two assists, and one steal in a 116–111 loss against the Indiana Pacers. On July 15, 2020, Lyles was reported to have undergone an appendectomy and was expected to miss the remainder of the 2019–20 season.

Detroit Pistons (2021–2022)
On August 6, 2021, Lyles signed a two-year, $5 million contract with the Detroit Pistons.

Sacramento Kings (2022–present)
On February 10, 2022, Lyles and Josh Jackson were acquired by the Sacramento Kings in a four-team trade that sent Marvin Bagley III to the Pistons.

On March 13, 2023, during a 133–124 loss to the Milwaukee Bucks, Lyles fouled and shoved Bucks forward Giannis Antetokounmpo, who was dribbling the ball out to end the game. Bucks center Brook Lopez then confronted Lyles, and Lyles struck Lopez in the face and grabbed him around the neck area. Both Lyles and Lopez were ejected from the game. Two days later, the NBA announced that Lyles had been suspended for one game without pay due to his role in the altercation.

Career statistics

NBA

Regular season

|-
| style="text-align:left;"| 
| style="text-align:left;"| Utah
| 80 || 33 || 17.3 || .438 || .383 || .695 || 3.7 || .7 || .3 || .2 || 6.1
|-
| style="text-align:left;"| 
| style="text-align:left;"| Utah
| 71 || 4 || 16.3 || .362 || .319 || .722 || 3.3 || 1.0 || .4 || .3 || 6.2
|-
| style="text-align:left;"| 
| style="text-align:left;"| Denver
| 73 || 2 || 19.1 || .491 || .381 || .706 || 4.8 || 1.2 || .4 || .5 || 9.9
|-
| style="text-align:left;"| 
| style="text-align:left;"| Denver
| 64 || 2 || 17.5 || .418 || .255 || .698 || 3.8 || 1.4 || .5 || .4 || 8.5
|-
| style="text-align:left;"| 
| style="text-align:left;"| San Antonio
| 63 || 53 || 20.2 || .446 || .387 || .733 || 5.7 || 1.1 || .4 || .4 || 6.4
|-
| style="text-align:left;"| 
| style="text-align:left;"| San Antonio
| 23 || 9 || 15.6 || .478 || .350 || .652 || 3.7 || .6 || .3 || .0 || 5.0
|-
| style="text-align:left;"| 
| style="text-align:left;"| Detroit
| 51 || 3 || 19.4 || .456 || .301 || .784 || 4.8 || 1.1 || .4 || .5 || 10.4
|-
| style="text-align:left;"| 
| style="text-align:left;"| Sacramento
| 24 || 20 || 22.8 || .489 || .365 || .851 || 5.6 || 1.3 || .3 || .3 || 10.6|- class="sortbottom"
| style="text-align:center;" colspan="2"| Career
| 449 || 126 || 18.3 || .441 || .338 || .737 || 4.3 || 1.1 || .4 || .3 || 7.8

Playoffs

|-
| style="text-align:left;"| 2017
| style="text-align:left;"| Utah
| 2 || 0 || 4.8 || .429 || .333 || .000 || 1.0 || .5 || .5 || .0 || 3.5|-
| style="text-align:left;"| 2019
| style="text-align:left;"| Denver
| 3 || 0 || 2.7 || .000 || .000 || .000 || .3 || .7''' || .0 || .0 || .0
|- class="sortbottom"
| align="center" colspan="2"| Career
| 5 || 0 || 3.6 || .300 || .250 || .000 || .6 || .6 || .2 || .0 || 1.4

College

|-
| style="text-align:left;"| 2014–15
| style="text-align:left;"| Kentucky
| 36 || 21 || 23.0 || .488 || .138 || .735 || 5.2 || 1.1 || .5 || .4 || 8.7

National team career
Lyles (who moved to Indiana with his family when he was seven years old) has represented both Canada and the United States. Until his sophomore year in high school, he had trained in the United States developmental pipeline.

On the international stage, Lyles played for Canada's Junior men's national team. During the summer of 2013, Lyles, along with Tyler Ennis, led Canada to a 6th-place finish at the 2013 FIBA Under-19 World Championship with Lyles coming in second to Ennis in scoring at the tournament.

References

External links

 Kentucky Wildcats bio

1995 births
Living people
American men's basketball players
Basketball people from Saskatchewan
Black Canadian basketball players
Canadian expatriate basketball people in the United States
Canadian men's basketball players
Denver Nuggets players
Detroit Pistons players
Kentucky Wildcats men's basketball players
McDonald's High School All-Americans
National Basketball Association players from Canada
Parade High School All-Americans (boys' basketball)
Power forwards (basketball)
Sacramento Kings players
San Antonio Spurs players
Sportspeople from Saskatoon
Utah Jazz draft picks
Utah Jazz players